Nikephoros Bryennios or Nicephorus Bryennius may refer to:

 Nikephoros Bryennios (ethnarch) (fl. 1050s), Byzantine general
 Nikephoros Bryennios the Elder (fl. 1070s), Byzantine general, son of the above, who made an attempt on the throne of Michael VII Doukas in 1077-1078
 Nikephoros Bryennios the Younger (1062–1137), son or grandson of the preceding, Byzantine general, statesman and historian